FK Teplice is a Czech football club based in the city of Teplice. The club currently plays in the Czech First League.

The club was founded after World War II in 1945. The club advanced to the Czechoslovak First League in just three years after being founded and played mostly in the First and Second Czechoslovak divisions. After the Velvet Revolution and comeback of rich sponsor, Glaverbel (spun out of glassworks Sklo Union in 1991), the club played in the Second Division until returning to the top flight in the 1996–97 Czech First League. Teplice were runners up in the 1998–99 Czech First League and went on to play in the 1999–2000 UEFA Champions League, although they lost their first match against Borussia Dortmund. The club subsequently won the Czech Cup in 2003 and went on to beat Kaiserslautern and Feyenoord en route to the third round of the 2003–04 UEFA Cup before losing over two legs against Celtic.

History

Recent history
The club's best league position was second in the 1998–99 season. In the 2004–05 season the team finished third, with the same number of points as second-place Slavia Prague. The finish allowed them to play in the third round of the UEFA Cup qualification, which Teplice won against MTZ-RIPO Minsk. In the first round of the UEFA Cup Teplice faced Espanyol. They were eliminated after drawing 1–1 in the first leg and losing 0–2 in the second leg.

In the 2007–08 season the team finished in fifth place in the Czech First League. The result earned them a place in the 2008 Intertoto Cup. However they lost on away goals in their first fixture, against Budapest Honvéd FC.

In 2009 Teplice again won the cup, qualifying yet again for European competition, this time the newly branded 2009–10 UEFA Europa League. However they went out in their first fixture, a 2–3 aggregate loss against Hapoel Tel Aviv.

Historical names
 1945 — SK Teplice-Šanov (Sportovní klub Teplice-Šanov)
 1948 — Sokol Teplice
 1949 — ZSJ Technomat Teplice (Základní sportovní jednota Technomat Teplice)
 1951 — ZSJ Vodotechna Teplice (Základní sportovní jednota Vodotechna Teplice)
 1952 — ZSJ Ingstav Teplice (Základní sportovní jednota Ingstav Teplice)
 1953 — DSO Tatran Teplice (Dobrovolná sportovní organizace Tatran Teplice)
 1960 — TJ Slovan Teplice (Tělovýchovná jednota Slovan Teplice)
 1966 — TJ Sklo Union Teplice (Tělovýchovná jednota Sklo Union Teplice)
 1991 — TFK VTJ Teplice (Tělovýchovný fotbalový klub Vojenská tělovýchovná jednota Teplice)
 1993 — FK Frydrych Teplice (Fotbalový klub Frydrych Teplice)
 1994 — FK Teplice (Fotbalový klub Teplice, a.s.)

Players

Current squad
.

Out on loan

Notable former players

Reserves
As of 2021/22, the club's reserve team FK Teplice B plays in the Bohemian Football League (3rd tier of Czech football system).

Player records in the Czech First League
.
Highlighted players are in the current squad.

Most appearances

Most goals

Most clean sheets

Managers

 Zdeněk Šteflík (1945–46)
 Rudolf Krčil (1947–48)
 Rudolf Vytlačil (1948–50)
 Kuželík (1950–51)
 Rudolf Krčil (1952–62)
 Vlastimil Chobot (1962–65)
 Jan Kalous (1965–66)
 Antonín Rýgr (1966–70)
 Josef Forejt (1970–73)
 Antonín Rýgr (1973–77)
 Karel Bílek (1977–79)
 Vladimír Mirka (1979–81)
 František Cerman (1981–83)
 Milan Kollár (1983–84)
 Josef Zadina (1984–85)
 Karel Vytisk (1985–86)
 Jiří Rubáš (1986–87)
 František Cerman (1987–89)
 Jaromír Mixa (1989–91)
 Milan Bokša (1991–93)
 František Cerman (1993–97)
 Josef Pešice (1997–00)
 Petr Rada (July 2000 – March 2001)
 Michal Bílek (2001)
 Dušan Uhrin (July 2001 – Aug 2001)
 František Cipro (Dec 2001 – Oct 2002)
 František Straka (Sept 2002 – March 2004)
 Jiří Nevrlý (2004)
 Jan Poštulka (2004)
 Vlastislav Mareček (July 2004 – 2006)
 Jiří Bartl (2007)
 Petr Rada (July 2007 – July 2008)
 Jiří Plíšek (July 2008 – June 2011)
 Petr Rada (July 2011 – June 2012)
 Lukáš Přerost (July 2012 – Sept 2012)
 Zdeněk Ščasný (Oct 2012 – Feb 2015)
 Petr Rada (Feb 2015 – May 2015)
 David Vavruška (June 2015 – May 2016)
 Daniel Šmejkal (June 2016 – Sept 2018)
 Stanislav Hejkal (Sept 2018 – Nov 2020)
 Radim Kučera (November 2020 – Sept 2021)
 Jiří Jarošík (September 2021 – March 2023)
 Zdenko Frťala (March 2023 – present)

History in domestic competitions

 Seasons spent at Level 1 of the football league system: 25
 Seasons spent at Level 2 of the football league system: 3
 Seasons spent at Level 3 of the football league system: 0
 Seasons spent at Level 4 of the football league system: 0

Czech Republic

History in European competitions

The following is a list of the all-time statistics from Teplice's games in the three UEFA tournaments it has participated in, as well as the overall total. The list contains the tournament, the number of seasons (S), games played (P), won (W), drawn (D) and lost (L). The statistics include qualification matches.
As of 30 June 2012.

Honours

Domestic
Czech Cup
Winners: 2002–03, 2008–09
Czech First League
Runner-up: 1998–99

Club records

Czech First League records
Best position: 2nd (1998–99)
Worst position: 15th (2020–21), (2021–22)
Biggest home win: Teplice 5–0 Kladno (2009–10), Teplice 5–0 Mladá Boleslav (2014–15)
Biggest away win: Slavia Prague 0–7 Teplice (2013–14)
Biggest home defeat: Teplice 0–8 Mladá Boleslav (2018–19)
Biggest away defeat: Plzeň 7–0 Teplice (2020–21)

References

External links

 (in Czech)
UEFA's FK Teplice site

 
Teplice, FK
Association football clubs established in 1945
Teplice, FK
Teplice, FK
Sport in Teplice